Siska is a German television series created by Herbert Reinecker and Helmut Ringelmann and broadcast since October 30, 1998 on the network ZDF. In France, the series was broadcast on France 3 and rebroadcast on 13th Street. It is a police drama and follows the adventures of Peter Siska, a police officer of Munich, and later Victor Siska.

Cast
Peter Kremer: Police Officer Peter Siska (Episodes 1–56, 1998–2004)
Matthias Freihof: Police Officer Lorenz Wiegand (Episodes 1–50, 1998–2003)
Robinson Reichel: Police Officer Felix Bender (Episodes 51–56, 2003)
Tobias Nath: Police Officer Gerhard Lessmann (Episodes 57–77, 2005–2007)
Wolfgang Maria Bauer: Police Officer Viktor Siska (Episodes 57–91, 2004–2008)
Werner Schnitzer: Police Officer Jacob Hahne (since 1998–2008)
Dirk Plönissen: Police Officer Robert Dahlberg (since 2007–2008)

References

External links
 

1998 German television series debuts
2008 German television series endings
German crime television series
1990s German police procedural television series
2000s German police procedural television series
German drama television series
Television shows set in Munich
German-language television shows
ZDF original programming